Riccardo Russo (born 10 October 1992, in Maddaloni) is an Italian motorcycle racer. In 2012 he was the CIV Superstock 600 champion and the European Superstock 600 Championship runner-up. He has also competed in the Superbike World Championship, the Supersport World Championship and the CIV Superbike Championship. He currently competes in the European Superstock 1000 Championship aboard a Kawasaki ZX-10R.

Career statistics

Supersport World Championship

Races by year
(key) (Races in bold indicate pole position; races in italics indicate fastest lap)

Superbike World Championship

Races by year
(key) (Races in bold indicate pole position; races in italics indicate fastest lap)

Grand Prix motorcycle racing

By season

Races by year
(key) (Races in bold indicate pole position; races in italics indicate fastest lap)

References

External links

1992 births
Living people
Italian motorcycle racers
Moto2 World Championship riders
Supersport World Championship riders
Superbike World Championship riders
FIM Superstock 1000 Cup riders